Akram Ansari (born 4 April 1954) is a Pakistani politician.

Political career

He ran for the seat of the National Assembly of Pakistan as a candidate for Non Party Election for Constituency NA-63 (Faisalabad-VII) in 1985 Pakistani by election and elected as MNA.He ran for the seat of the Pakistan Muslim League N as a candidate for Constituency NA-63 (Faisalabad-VII) in 1988 Pakistani General election but was unsuccessful.

He was elected to the National Assembly as a candidate for IJI for Constituency NA-63 (Faisalabad-VII) in 1990 Pakistani general election. He received 60,983 votes.

He was re-elected to the National Assembly as a candidate for Pakistan Muslim League (N) (PML-N) for Constituency NA-63 (Faisalabad-VII) in 1993 Pakistani general election. He received 62,592 votes.

He was re-elected to the National Assembly as a candidate for PML-N for Constituency NA-63 (Faisalabad-VII) in 1997 Pakistani general election. He received 62,963 votes.

Ansari could not run in the 2002 general election due not having a degree.

Ansari was re-elected to the National Assembly as a candidate for PML-N for Constituency NA-85 (Faisalabad-XI) in 2008 Pakistani general election. He secured 72197 votes.

He was re-elected to the National Assembly as a candidate for PML-N for Constituency NA-85 (Faisalabad-XI) in 2013 Pakistani general election.

Following the election of Shahid Khaqan Abbasi as Prime Minister of Pakistan in August 2017, he was inducted into the federal cabinet of Abbasi. He was appointed as the Minister of State for Commerce and Textile. Upon the dissolution of the National Assembly on the expiration of its term on 31 May 2018, Ansari ceased to hold the office as Minister of State for Commerce and Textile.

References

Living people
People from Faisalabad
Pakistan Muslim League (N) MNAs
University of the Punjab alumni
Pakistani MNAs 2013–2018
Punjabi people
1954 births
Pakistani MNAs 2008–2013
Pakistani MNAs 1990–1993
Pakistani MNAs 1993–1996
Pakistani MNAs 1997–1999